The 2012 Four Nations Cup is a women's ice hockey tournament that was held in Tikkurila, Finland.

Results

Preliminary round

Bronze medal game

Gold medal game

References

See also
2013 4 Nations Cup
2014 4 Nations Cup

2012–13
2012–13 in Finnish ice hockey
2012–13 in Swedish ice hockey
2012–13 in Canadian women's ice hockey
2012–13 in American women's ice hockey
2012–13
2012–13 in women's ice hockey